Mukthiyar General Sri Sri Sri Chautariya Pushkar Shah (August 16, 1784 – 1841) was the prime minister (Mukhtiyar) of Nepal from August 1838 to early 1839. He previously served as the Governor of Doti from 1831 to 1837, and as Special Ambassador to China from 1837 to 1838. He was the counselor of state from 1840 to 1841. Pushkar Shah had four sons: Sri Chautaria Bhim Bikram Shah, Rana Bikram Shah, Colonel Sri Chautaria Bir Bikram Shah, and Colonel Ambar Bikram Shah.

Governor of Doti and a Secret Strategic Alliance with Maharaja Ranjit Singh of Punjab 
Chautariya Pushkar Shah  was the Governor of  Doti from 1831 to 1837. He was sent there by  King Rajendra Bikram Shah to secretly forge an alliance between Nepal and Punjab against the British. Following Punjab's annexation, the British imprisoned the Rani Jind Kaur in Chunar fort near Varanasi. However, two years later in 1849, she managed to escape from the fort disguised as a maid and traveled 800 km north to reach Kathmandu. Initially, she stayed at the residence of Chatariya's son Amar Bikram Shah in the  Narayanhiti area.

Secret Strategic Alliance with the Emperor Daoguang (Qing Dynasty) of China.

Diplomatic Team
Nepal sent its tenth quinquennial mission to China in 1837, under the leadership of Chautariya Pushkar Shah. He was an important member of a collateral branch of the royal family. Chautariya was accompanied by a retinue consisting of Sardar Captain Kirti Dhoj Pande (deputy leader of the mission), Rana Bikram Shah, Khardar Purna Nanda, Vansaraj Thapa (interpreter), Mahiman Karki, Amrit Mahat, Dal Bir Khatri, Gajadhar Padhya, Bhau Singh, Yaktabar (Shaktabar) Jaisi, Mammu Miya, Bhariya Nayak Padma Narayan, Gotha Rana and Dambar Thapa. The total cost of the mission was Rs. 34,663 and the presents to the Ching Emperor Tao-kuang were estimated to be valued at Rs. 7,133. The mission had carried presents to Dhewas of Kuti, Chuii of Tingri, Talloye of Digarcha, Lama of Digarcha, the four Kajis of Lhasa, Raja Lama of Takayali, the Potala Lama, the Chinese Ambans, the Chundu of Chindafu, the Chundu of Sindafu and Tu Thwang.

Preparation for the Second Anglo-Gorkha War

Departure to Peking
Chautariya Pushkar Shah's mission left Kathmandu on 14 July 1837. As a strict follower of Hindu Religion, Chautariya Pushkar Shah observed its rules and regulations strictly throughout his journey. For example, he did not accept tea offered by others during the journey and he only ate food cooked by his own personal cook. Upon arrival, Chautariya was given a warm welcome in China by the Chinese Emperor.

In December 1835, the political rival of Prime Minister Bhimsen Thapa had requested Chinese Amban's in Lhasa to request King Rajendra Bikram Shah to send Ranajung Pande as the leader of the 10th quinquennial mission to China. As a result, the Chinese Amban wrote to the Nepalese King to personally nominate the leader of the next five-year mission to Peking. The Chinese Amban strongly suggested that Rana Jang Pande be appointed leader of the mission.

King's Trusted Men
King Rajendra Bikram Shah nominated his most trusted courtier Chautariya Pushkar Shah instead of Rana Jang Pande. One source however states that the Chinese Amban had also suggested King Rajendra not to send wicked Rana Jang Pande, but to nominate another good, virtuous person to lead the quinquennial mission to the Ching Emperor's Court. Despite this, Jagat Bam Pande was originally supposed to lead the 1837 mission. 
After Chautariya Pushkar Shah left for Peking there was a big political upheaval in Nepal with the dismissal and imprisonment of the Prime Minister Bhimsen Thapa. Bhimsen Thapa held the post of Prime Minister continuously for thirty one years. The Nepalese court informed the Chautariya about the political developments in Nepal and dispatched him a letter to hand over to the Ching Emperor. Due to the political turmoil in Nepal, the Chautariya tried to complete his mission and return to Nepal as early as possible. He completed the round-trip journey to Peking in less than fourteen months. The mission of 1837 recorded a detailed and systematic summary of the routes from Kathmandu to Peking as traveled by the Nepalese envoy to Peking.

Return Trip
The delegates returned home on 25 September 1838 with the Chinese Emperor's Parwana. The return trip from Peking to Kathmandu took nearly six months. During the return trip, two members of the Nepalese mission i.e. one Subedar and one Sipahi died on the way.  The diplomatic team had requested the Ching court to send troops or provide a subsidy of twenty million rupees to opposes the British as Nepal was planning to wage a second war with the colonial power. However, the Nepalese Delegation was met with a stern refusal of its petition for monetary aid, and were also requested not to go to war with the British. The Quing court did not support Nepal's call for help.

Importance of the mission
The 1837 mission was the first Nepalese quinquennial mission ever led by a prominent political personality like Chautariya Pushkar Shah. This mission was different from other Nepalese quinquennial missions in several ways. Firstly, the deputy leader of the 1837 mission was Captain Kirti Dhoj Pande, being the first time that the highest Nepalese military official was assigned the post of deputy leader of the mission. Secondly, the mission carried many expensive presents to the Ching Emperor. The Nepalese presents were so far the most expensive thus far. Thirdly, soon after his return from Peking as the leader of the Nepalese quinquennial mission to China, Chautariya Pushkar Shah was appointed to the post of Prime Minister in 1838. Thus Chautariya Pushkar Shah established his important role in the history of Sino-Nepalese relations.

Prime Minister of Nepal/Commander in Chief - Nepali Army
Puskar Shah was the prime minister of Nepal for a brief time from August 1838 to early 1839. He was made the Prime Minister and the Chief of the Nepalese Army of Nepal by King Rajendra against the will of the junior Queen Rajya Laxmi. At the time when he was made the prime minister, the court of Nepal had been divided into two factions: one faction opposed the British and wanted to declare war, whereas the other faction wanted to maintain peace. Puskar Shah believed in waging a  war with the British.  He was forced to resign from the post of the Prime Minister in early 1839 mainly because the British persistently requested King Rajendra Bikram Shah to remove Shah from the post and install Rana Jang Pande, a minister supporting the British.

Children
Chatariya Puskar Shah had four sons: Sri Chautaria Bhim Bikram Shah, Rana Bikram Shah, Colonel Sri Chautaria Bir Bikram Shah, and Colonel Ambar Bikram Shah. Colonel Ambar Bikram Shah was killed by the Ranas for his part in the attempted coup d'état, at Teku, January 1882. Fearing wrath from the Ranas, his son Jabber Jung Shah escaped with his son Amar Jung Shah to a village in Dhading disguised as Jogis and settled there before coming overground in 1885 after the assassination of Ranodip_Singh_Kunwar.

References

1784 births
1841 deaths
Mukhtiyars
Prime ministers of Nepal
People from Kathmandu
Chautariya
19th-century prime ministers of Nepal
Nepalese Hindus